Anthology is the third compilation album of songs by American new wave band Oingo Boingo. The two-disc set is the band's first full career-spanning retrospective, compiling material from all of the band's albums on I.R.S. Records, A&M Records, MCA Records and Giant Records.

Track listing
All songs written and composed by Danny Elfman.

Disc One

Disc Two

Personnel

 Danny Elfman – lead vocals, rhythm guitars
 Steve Bartek – lead guitars, background vocals
 Johnny "Vatos" Hernandez – drums, percussion
 Leon Schneiderman – baritone and alto saxophones
 Sam "Sluggo" Phipps – tenor and soprano saxophones
 Dale Turner – trumpet, trombones
 Richard Gibbs - keyboards (disc 1: tracks 1-16)

 Kerry Hatch - bass (disc 1: tracks 1-16)
 John Avila – bass, background vocals (disc 1: tracks 17-18, disc 2: tracks 1-16) 
 Michael Bacich - keyboards (disc 1: tracks 17-18, disc 2: tracks 1-4)
 Carl Graves - keyboards (disc 2: tracks 5-9,16)
 Warren Fitzgerald – guitars, background vocals (disc 2: tracks 10-15)
 Marc Mann - keyboards, samples (disc 2: tracks 10-15)
 Doug Lacy - accordion (disc 2: tracks 10-15)

References

Anthology (Oingo Boingo)
1999 compilation albums
Hip-O Records compilation albums